Harry John "Yip" Radley (June 27, 1908 – April 19, 1963) was a Canadian professional ice hockey player who played 18 games in the National Hockey League for the New York Americans and Montreal Maroons between 1930 and 1937. A member of the Mann Cup winning Ottawa Emmetts lacrosse team, he also played Canadian football for Ottawa, before choosing hockey for a career, which he played between 1930 and 1942.

Personal life
Radley married Margaret Bradley in 1936 in Tulsa, Oklahoma, while playing for the Tulsa Oilers, and had one son, Peter J. Radley KStJ, QC. Upon retirement Yip moved to Kingston, Ontario, where he became the athletic director for Alcan, Kingston Works, a position he held until his untimely death in 1963. Funerals were held in both Ottawa [St Joseph's RC Church - Sandy Hill] and Kingston [St. Mary's Cathedral] and he was buried in the Radley Family plot with his parents and brother in Notre Dame Cemetery, Ottawa. In 2017, Yip Radley was inducted into the Kingston and District Sports Hall of Fame, Kingston, Ontario, Canada.

Career statistics

Regular season and playoffs

External links
 

1908 births
1963 deaths
Canadian ice hockey defencemen
Cleveland Falcons players
Cleveland Indians (IHL) players
Ice hockey people from Ottawa
Kansas City Greyhounds players
Montreal Maroons players
New Haven Eagles players
New York Americans players
Ontario Hockey Association Senior A League (1890–1979) players
Providence Reds players
St. Louis Flyers (AHA) players
Tulsa Oilers (AHA) players
Wichita Skyhawks players
Canadian expatriate ice hockey players in the United States